Jewel and Esk College was a further education college in the Lothians in Scotland. It had two campuses, located at Milton Road in Edinburgh and at Eskbank, Dalkeith, Midlothian.

In October 2012 the college merged with Edinburgh's other two FE colleges (Telford College and Stevenson College) to form a new entity called Edinburgh College. Jewel & Esk's campuses now form two of the four main sites of the new college.

Students 

The college catered for 7,000 students on a full/part-time and Open learning basis, along with a specialist facility for blind individuals located on the Milton Road campus.

In 2006/2007 Jewel & Esk College had 6500 students accounting for 7550 enrolments.

Past 

Jewel and Esk Valley College was created in 1987 from the merger of Leith Nautical College (a former Central Institution) and Esk Valley College. 
In 2008 the Scottish Parliament approved the college name change to Jewel & Esk College. The Jewel part of the name refers to a former coal-mining area in the college's catchment area.

Campuses 

The college campuses were remodelled between 2006 and 2008. In Dalkeith a new build replaced an older building (now demolished) across the road from the current site. The college at Milton Road kept the original building that resembles a ship, which was renovated with the addition of a new service industries centre called The Club. 
The buildings and facilities at both locations are innovative and purpose built to deliver modern educational qualifications and skills.

Natural light flows through many of the spaces, highlighting the dynamic nature of the buildings and showcasing key areas of the College.

Midlothian Campus
At Hardengreen, the new Midlothian Campus opened to students in 2008 as one of the most advanced technology teaching centres in Scotland, featuring an Oil Production Platform Simulator, specialist engineering and construction equipment and purpose built plumbing and electrical workshops.

Jewel & Esk College had a strong tradition in technology based studies; three students won national competitions in 2007/08 along with four others proving successful in regional competition.

External links
Edinburgh College

Further education colleges in Scotland
Further education colleges in Edinburgh
Dalkeith